Per Olof Axelsson (born 4 November 1966) is a Swedish curler.

Teams

Men's

Mixed

References

External links
 

Living people
1966 births
Swedish male curlers
Swedish curling champions